Els Iping (born 15 April 1953, Amsterdam) is a Dutch politician. As of 2007, Eping was chairman of the local council of Amsterdam's central district.

References

1953 births
Living people
Municipal councillors of Amsterdam
Labour Party (Netherlands) politicians
21st-century Dutch politicians